Homecoming is the second EP by Sammy Adams. The EP was released on November 19 2013, by RCA Records.

Track listing

Chart positions

References

2013 EPs
Sammy Adams albums
RCA Records EPs